Prahlad Keshav Atre (13 August 1898 – 13 June 1969), popularly known as Āchārya Atre, was a prominent Marathi writer, poet, educationist, founder–editor of Maratha (a Marathi language newspaper), and above all a noted orator.

Biography

Early life
Atre was born on 13 August 1898 in a Marathi Deshastha Rigvedi Brahmin family of Kodit Khurd, a village near Saswad in Pune district. His father was a clerk and also a secretary of Saswad Municipality for a brief period and his uncle was teacher at MES Waghire High School Saswad. He completed his primary and High School education from MES Waghire High School, Saswad. He matriculated from Fergusson college in 1919. He completed Bachelor of Arts from University of Pune. After graduation Atre took up a career as a school teacher. Atre did his T. D. (teacher's diploma) from the University of London in 1928. Before returning to India he studied Experimental Psychology under Cyril Burt and taught at Harrow.

Film and theatre career
His Marathi film, Shyamchi Aai won the 1954 National Film Award for Best Feature Film. Atre wrote seven plays; some of them had a humorous theme while others, a serious one. All of them received high public acclaim. His comedy-play, Moruchi Mavshi was later adapted into Hindi film, Aunty No. 1 (1998), starring Govinda and Raveena Tandon.
His movie Mahatma Phule (1955) received the President's Silver Medal.

Writing and Publishing
Atre was the founder–editor of four Marathi newspapers. Two of them had a short life. But the other two, Maratha and (Weekly) Navayug, ran for many years with a large circulation.

Political career 
 Member of Samyukta Maharashtra Samiti during 1956–60. He was arrested in 1956 under the Preventive Detention Act for his agitation.
 Member of Maharashtra Vidhan Sabha from Dadar constituency (18) 1962–1967

However his ambition of becoming a member of the Indian Parliament could not be fulfilled as he lost these elections.

Important works

Plays
 Sāshtāng Namaskār (1935)
 Gharābāher (1934)
 Bhramāchā Bhopalā (1935)
 Udyāchā Sansār (1936)
 Lagnāchi Bedi (1936)
 Moruchi Māwashi (1947) a Marathi comedy play
 To Mi Navhech (1962)

Novels, Biographies, and Essays
 Chāngunā (1954)
 Battāshi Wa Itar Kathā (1954)
 Mahātmā Jyotibā Phule (1958)
 Suryāsta (1964) (On the life of Jawaharlal Nehru)
 Samādhiwaril Ashru (1956)
 Kelyāne Deshātan (1961)
 Atre Uwāch (1937)
 Lalit Wāngmaya (1944)
 Hashā Āni Tālyā (1958)
 Dalitanche Baba (Remembering Dr. Ambedkar)
Mi Kasā Jhālo (1953)

Movies
 Brahmachari (1938)
Shyāmchi Aai (1953)
 Premveer (Script writer)
 Dharmveer (Script writer)
 Brandichi Bātali (Script writer)
 Paayaachi Daasi (Hindi: Charanon Ki Daasi). Producer.
 Mahātmā Phule
 Parinde (Hindi, Director under name of Principal Atre) (1945)

Journalism
 Founder/Editor of (weekly) Sāptāhik Navyug (1940–1962) and Tukārām (1954)
 Evening newspaper Jai Hind (1948)
 Daily Marāthā (1956 – Till the end)

Honors 
 President of 38th Natya Sammelan at Belgaon (1955)
 President of 10th Maharashatra Patrakar Sammelan (1950)
 President of Regional Sahitya Sammelan at Baroda, Indore and Gwalior
 In his honor there is an Acharya atre bhavan in Saswad

Awards 

National Film Awards (India)
 1st National Film Awards (1953) – President's Gold Medal for the All India Best Feature Film – Shyamchi Aai
 2nd National Film Awards (1954) – President's Silver Medal for Best Feature Film in Marathi – Mahatma Phule

References 

 Prahlad Keshav Atre, by A. N. Pednekar. Sahitya Akademi Publications. .

External links 
 
 Prahlad Keshav Atre

1898 births
1969 deaths
Marathi-language writers
Marathi-language poets
Marathi film directors
Businesspeople from Pune
Maharashtra MLAs 1962–1967
Marathi film producers
Indian male novelists
Indian autobiographers
Indian newspaper editors
Indian magazine editors
Indian magazine founders
Presidents of the Akhil Bharatiya Marathi Sahitya Sammelan
20th-century Indian poets
20th-century Indian novelists
20th-century Indian dramatists and playwrights
Indian male dramatists and playwrights
Indian male screenwriters
Marathi politicians
Writers from Pune
Politicians from Pune
Screenwriters from Maharashtra
Novelists from Maharashtra
Poets from Maharashtra
20th-century Indian male writers
Producers who won the Best Feature Film National Film Award
Directors who won the Best Feature Film National Film Award
Independent politicians in India
20th-century Indian screenwriters